Natalia Ivaneeva (born 9 February 1990) is a Russian swimmer. She competed in the women's 100 metre breaststroke event at the 2017 World Aquatics Championships.

References

External links
 

1990 births
Living people
Place of birth missing (living people)
World Aquatics Championships medalists in swimming
Russian female breaststroke swimmers
Competitors at the 2015 Summer Universiade